Okello (also spelled Okelo) is a common surname of the Luo and Ateker peoples of Uganda, Kenya and Sudan. It may refer to:

People
Okello Oculi (born 1942), Ugandan novelist and  poet
Allan Okello (born 2000), Ugandan footballer
David Okello (born 1986), Kenyan footballer
Emmy Okello (born 1977), Ugandan consultant physician
James Okello (born 1990), Ugandan basketball player
John Okello (1937–1971), Ugandan-born leader of the Zanzibar revolution
Noble Okello (born 2000), Canadian soccer player
Tito Okello (1914–1996), former head of state of Uganda
Bazilio Olara-Okello (1929–1990), former head of state of Uganda
Henry Oryem Okello (born 1960), Ugandan politician

Other uses
Okello, a character in the 1972 film Aguirre, the Wrath of God
Surnames of Ugandan origin